This list of Honorary Graduates of the University of Exeter is a year-by-year list of people recognized by the University of Exeter for their achievements in their given field with an honorary award.

An honorary degree or a degree honoris causa (Latin: 'for the sake of the honour') is an academic degree for which a university (or other degree-awarding institution) has waived the usual requirements (such as matriculation, residence, study and the passing of examinations). The degree itself is typically a doctorate or, less commonly, a master's degree, and may be awarded to someone who has no prior connection with the academic institution.

2020s
2021

2020
 Anastasios Paul Leventis (LLD)

2010s
2019
 Chunli Bai (DSc)
 Kate Lampard CBE (LLD)
 Teresa Gleadowe (DLitt)
 Moira Marder (LLD)
 Reni Eddo-Lodge (DLitt)
 Richard Hughes FCA (LLD)
 Roderick MacSween (DLitt)
 Karime Hassan (LLD)
 Hugo Tagholm (DSc)
 Sarah Mullally DBE, PC (DDiv)
 Professor Joseph Sung (DSc)
 Elena Becker-Barroso (DSc)
 Dame Mary Beard DBE, FSA, FBA (DLitt)
 Gordon Marshall CBE (LLD)
 Howard Fillit MD (DSc)
 Eliud Kipchoge (LLD)

2018
 Ruth Hunt (LLD)
 John Simpson CBE (DLitt)
 Simon Timson (DSc)
 Sir John Savill FRSE, FMedSci, FRS (DSc)
 Sir Simon Charles Wessely FMedSci (DSc)
 Alan Johnson PC (LLD)
 Felix Barrett MBE (DLitt)
 Sir Robin Nicholson FRS (DSc)
 Raymond J. St. Leger (DSc)
 Robert McCrum (DLitt)
 Natasha Trethewey (DLitt)
 Barbara Vann DL (DSc)
 Laura Penhaul (LLD)
 Andrew Garrad CBE (DEng)
 Adama Dieng (LLD)
 Neil Woodford CBE (LLD)
 Jeremy Hughes CBE (DSc)

2017
 Lieutenant Colonel Lucy Giles (LLD)
 Jeremy "Jez" Butterworth (DLitt)
 Alex Farquharson (DLitt)
 Lindsey Hilsum (DLitt)
 Sir Donald McCullin CBE, Hon FRPS (DLitt)
 Lady Studholme (DLitt)
 Philip Collins (DLitt)
 Tony Sewell CBE (LLD)
 Rob Baxter (LLD)
 Jonathan Adams (DSc)
 Mireille Gillings (DSc)
 Bertil Andersson (DSc)
 Peter Lacey (LLD)
 Helen Brand OBE (LLD)
 Hilary Evans (DSc)
 Ian L. Boyd FSB, FSRE (DSc)
 Augustin Hadelich (DMus)
 The Lord Neuberger of Abbotsbury (LLD)

2016
 Clare Marx CBE, DL, PRCS (DSc)
 Sir Robert Francis QC (LLD)
 Jeremy Paxman (DLitt)
 Camilla Hampshire (LLD)
 John Pullinger CB (LLD)
 Paul Johnson (LLD)
 Gillian Tett (DLitt)
 Dr Christine Loh Kung-wai OBE, JP (DSc)
 Paul Polman (LLD)
 Edward Barry Farwell MBE (LLD)
 Sally Gunnell OBE (LLD)
 Richard W. Michelmore (DSc)

2015
 Glynis Atherton (LLD)
 The Lord Adonis (LLD)
 Sir John Goldring PC (LLD)
 Ralph Wilcox (LLD)
 Joanne Pavey MBE (LLD)
 Mandy McBain MBE (LLD)
 Richard Atkins (LLD)
 Sir Andrew Witty (LLD)
 Alvin Roth (LLD)
 Graham Cole CBE, FRAeS (LLD)
 Dame Alison Carnwath DBE (LLD)
 Trevor Phillips OBE (DLitt)
 Abi Morgan (DLitt)
 Steve Field CBE, FRCP, FFPHM, FRCGP (DSc)
 Dame Anne Glover DBE (DSc)
 Dame Julia King DBE, FREng (DSc)
 Sir John Bell GBE, FRS (DSc)
 Stephen T. Holgate CBE (DSc)

2014
 Wol Kolade (LLD)
 Teresa Rees CBE, AcSS, FRSA (LLD)
 Tony Rowe OBE (LLD)
 Roy Pike FRSA (LLD)
 Sigrid Kaag (LLD)
 The Baroness Lawrence of Clarendon OBE (LLD)
 The Lord Bilimoria CBE, DL (LLD)
 Kanya King MBE (LLD)
 Tim Hollingsworth (LLD)
 Carl Gilleard OBE (LLD)
 Philip Bostock OBE, DL (LLD)
 Mike Leigh OBE (DLitt)
 Thomas Trevor (DLitt)
 Sir Mark Walport FRS (DSc)
 Dame Julia Slingo DBE (DSc)

2013
 James Jones (DDiv)
 Alexandra Jellicoe (DEng)
 Elizabeth Earland (LLD)
 Ashley Tabor (LLD)
 Ambassador Barry Desker (LLD)
 Sir Brian Burridge KCB, CBE (LLD)
 Russell Seal OBE (LLD)
 Steve Perryman MBE (LLD)
 David Allen, OBE (LLD)
 Timothy C. Niblock (LLD)
 Alexander Beleschenko (DLitt)
 Leo Hickman (DLitt)

2012
 Iain Gray CBE, CEng, FREng, FRAes, FRDE (DEng)
 Stephen Edge (LLD)
 Barry Bateman (LLD)
 Judge Demetrios Hadjihambis (LLD)
 The Baroness Kennedy QC, FRSA (LLD)
 Alan Milburn PC (LLD)
 Bryn Parry OBE (LLD)
 Emma Parry OBE (LLD)
 Sir Michael Pownall KCB (LLD)
 Steve Backshall (DLitt)
 Nik Gowing (DLitt)
 Armando Iannucci (DLitt)
 Cynthia Carroll (DSc)
 Dame Athene Donald DBE, FRS (DSc)
 Russell Hamilton CBE (DSc)
 John Hirst CBE (DSc)

2011
 Si-Chen Lee (DEng)
 Steve Hindley CBE, DL (DEng)
 Sir Peter Lampl OBE (LLD)
 Harriet Lamb CBE (LLD)
 Barbara Frost (LLD)
 Les Halpin (LLD)
 Angela Pedder OBE (LLD)
 Dato Ambiga Sreenevasan (LLD)
 Jim French CBE (LLD)
 Dame Hilary Mantel DBE, FRSL (DLitt)
 Neil Canning (DLitt)
 Andrew D. Hamilton FRS (DSc)
 Dennis Gillings CBE (DSc)
 Sir Peter Rubin (DSc)

2010
 Sheikha Lubna bint Khalid Al Qasimi (LLD)
 Dame Julia Cleverdon DCVO, CBE (LLD)
 Sir John Rose (LLD)
 Sir Eric Dancer KCVO, CBE, JP (LLD)
 Sir Richard Lambert (LLD)
 Sir Ian Botham OBE (LLD)
 The Baroness Young of Old Scone (LLD)
 Shami Chakrabarti CBE (LLD)
 Deborah Meaden (LLD)
 Jane Knight (LLD)
 The Baroness Shackleton of Belgravia LVO (LLD)
 Sharron Davies MBE (LLD)
 Baroness Sue Campbell CBE (LLD)
 Philip Pullman CBE, FRSL (DLitt)
 Elaine Goodwin (DLitt)
 Peter Randall-Page (DLitt)
 Kuljit Bhamra MBE (DMus)
 Dame Sally Claire Davies DBE (DSc)
 Lady Ann Redgrave (DSc)
 Dame Alison Richard DBE, DL (DSc)

2000s
2009
 Bill Ind (DDiv)
 Clive Lee (DEng)
 Christopher Mullard CBE, DL (LLD)
 Clive Stafford Smith OBE (LLD)
 Richard Ward FRSA (LLD)
 Sir Ian Carruthers OBE (LLD)
 Satish Kumar (LLD)
 Sir Michael Barber (LLD)
 Gerald Sturtridge OBE (LLD)
 Don Boyd (DLitt)
 Karen Armstrong FRSL (DLitt)
 Sir Leszek Borysiewicz DL (DSc)
 Sir Denis Pereira Gray OBE (DSc)
 R. S. M. Ling OBE, FRCS (DSc)

2008
 Sarah Buck (DEng)
 Sheikh Ahmed Zaki Yamani (LLD)
 Sir Martin Harris CBE, DL (LLD)
 Mark Thompson(LLD)
 Ian Henderson (LLD)
 Sir David Brewer CMG, JP (LLD)
 Jonathan Dimbleby (LLD)
 Dame Mary Keegan DBE (LLD)
 Sir Robin Knox-Johnston CBE, RD (LLD)
 Ruth Hawker OBE (LLD)
 Olga Polizzi CBE (LLD)
 Jonathon Porritt CBE (LLD)
 Amartya Sen (LLD)
 Ahdaf Soueif (DLitt)
 Rik Mayall (DLitt)
 Ken Follett (DLitt)
 Sir David Attenborough OM, CH, CVO, CBE, FRS (DSc)

2007
 Michael Langrish (DDiv)
 Frank Gardner OBE (LLD)
 Ekmeleddin Ihsanoğlu (LLD)
 Yusuf Islam (LLD)
 Anthony Gibson, OBE (LLD)
 Sir Robert Owen(LLD)
 Sir Peter Job (LLD)
 Sir Richard Dearlove KCMG, OBE (LLD)
 Ray Dillon (LLD)
 Sir Clive Woodward OBE (LLD)
 Richard Hooper CBE (LLD)
 Peter Lord CBE (LLD)
 David Sproxton CBE (LLD)
 Adrian Edmondson (DLitt)
 Jennifer Saunders (DLitt)
 David Eldridge (DLitt)
 Beverley Naidoo (DLitt)
 Michael Rosen (DLitt)
 Posy Simmonds MBE (DLitt)
 Kurt Jackson (DLitt)
 Brian May CBE (DSc)
 The Lord Stern of Brentford (DSc)
 Dame Carol Black DBE, PRCP (DSc)
 The Lord Rees of Ludlow (DSc)

2006
 Sue Barker (LLD)
 Princess Maha Chakri Sirindhorn (LLD)
 Roderick Ross (LLD)
 Sir Anthony Clarke (LLD)
 Alan Cotton (DLitt)
 Peter Ewins (DSc)
 Sir John Beringer (DSc)
 William Wakeham (DSc)

2005
 Jane Henderson (LLD)
 Abdullah Gül (LLD)
 Ben Ainslie (LLD)
 John Allwood (LLD)
 Sir Tom Shebbeare (LLD)
 Admiral Sir Jonathon Band (LLD)
 The Baroness Prashar (LLD)
 Tony Robinson (LLD)
 Stewart Purvis (LLD)
 Jonathan Edwards(LLD)
 Floella Benjamin (DLitt)
 Jane Lapotaire (DLitt)
 Benjamin Zephaniah (DLitt)
 Sir Peter Mansfield (DSc)
 Michael Fish (DSc)

2004
 Sir Ewen Cameron DL, FRICS (LLD)
 Irene Bishop (LLD)
 Ian Powell (LLD)
 The Baroness Uddin (LLD)
 Lord Justice Sedley (LLD)
 Pen Hadow (LLD)
 Michael Caines (LLD)
 Paul Jackson (DLitt)
 Ben Okri (DLitt)
 Michael Morpurgo (DLitt)
 Barbara Jefford (DLitt)
 Dame Julia Higgins (DSc)
 The Lord Winston (DSc)

2003
 Sir Geoffrey Holland (LLD)
 Tanni Grey-Thompson (LLD)
 Dame Suzi Leather (LLD)
 Paul Myners CBE (LLD)
 Anthony Salz (LLD)
 The Lord Wilson of Dinton (LLD)
 Simon Jenkins (DLitt)
 Sir Christopher Ondaatje (DLitt)
 Sir Antony Sher (DLitt)
 Jatinder Verma (DLitt)
 Richard Case (DSc)
 Sir Christopher Evans OBE (DSc)
 Sir John Sulston (DSc)

2002
 Ann Daniels (LLD)
 Norman Hardyman, CB (LLD)
 Bridget Kendall (LLD)
 Christopher Patten CH, PC (LLD)
 Marjorie Scardino (LLD)
 Sir David Walker (LLD)
 The Lord Woolf of Barnes PC (LLD)
 Angela Yeoman OBE, DL (LLD)
 Prince Waleed bin Talal Al Saud (LLD)
 Sir Tim Rice (DLitt)
 Rick Stein (DLitt)
 George Gray CBE, FRS (DSc)
 Timothy Hunt (DSc)

2001
 Rowan Williams (DDiv)
 Queen Rania Al-Abdullah (LLD)
 Sir Peter Davis (LLD)
 Mr Justice Elias (LLD)
 Timothy Smit (LLD)
 Bridget Towle CBE (LLD)
 Mohammed Arkoun (DLitt)
 Wilhelmina Barns-Graham (DLitt)
 Helen Dunmore (DLitt)
 Susan Hampshire (DLitt)
 Seamus Heaney (DLitt)
 Edward Said (DLitt)
 George Weidenfeld, Baron Weidenfeld GBE (DLitt)
 Christopher Bruce CBE (DLitt)
 Dame Gillian Weir (DMus)
 Sir Harold Kroto FRS (DSc)
 Jane Plant CBE (DSc)
 Dame Lesley Southgate (DSc)

2000
 Bartholomew I (LLD)
 Lady Sally Greengross (LLD)
 Margaret Lorenz (LLD)
 Peter Sutherland (LLD)
 Joanne K. Rowling OBE (DLitt)
 Sir Nicholas Serota (DLitt)
 Evelyn Glennie DBE (DMus)
 Edward W. Abel CBE (DSc)
 Per-Olaf Astrand (DSc)
 Sir Ghillean Prance (DSc)
 Sir John Taylor (DSc)

1990s
1999
 Cardinal Cahal Brendan Daly (DDiv)
 The Lord Eames (DDiv)
 The Baroness Brenda Dean (LLD)
 Charles Handy (LLD)
 Christopher Moon (LLD)
 Sir Terry Frost (DLitt)
 Edward Mortimer (DLitt)
 Andrew Motion (DLitt)
 Adrian Noble (DLitt)
 Imogen Cooper (DMus)
 Susan Greenfield (DSc)
 Dame Bridget Ogilvie (DSc)
 Helen Sharman (DSc)
 Sir Crispin Tickell (DSc)
 David Warren Turner (DSc)
 Sir David Weatherall (DSc)

1998
 David Sheppard (DDiv)
 Desmond Tutu (DDiv)
 Noel Warner (DEng)
 The Lord Butler GCB (LLD)
 The Lord Dearing KCB (LLD)
 The Lord Nolan (LLD)
 Lord Justice Phillips (LLD)
 Tadeusz Mazowiecki (LLD)
 The Lord Rothschild (LLD)
 Robert Neil MacGregor (DLitt)
 Alfred Brendel Hon. KBE (DMus)
 John Krebs FRS (DSc)
 Dato' Mohamad Idris Mansor (DSc)

1997
 Sir Edward George (LLD)
 Sir David Tweedie (LLD)
 Lady Mary Holborow JP (LLD)
 The Lord Rix (LLD)
 Joyce Youings (DLitt)
 Bridget Riley CBE (DLitt)
 Hugh Allen (DSc)
 Sir Donald Irvine CBE (DSc)

1996
 Sir David Calcutt QC (LLD)
 Peter Chalk (LLD)
 Dame Stella Rimington (LLD)
 Sir Stephen Tumim (LLD)
 Sir Alan Bowness (DLitt)
 Sir William Stubbs (DLitt)
 T. R. P. Brighouse (DLitt)
 Richard L. Gregory (DSc)
 Samuel E. Jonah (DSc)
 Sir Maurice Laing (DSc)
 Sir Michael Peckham (DSc)

1995
 The Lord Alexander of Weedon QC, FRSA (LLD)
 Nigel Beale (LLD)
 Zoltan P. Dienes (LLD)
 The Lord Morley (LLD)
 Mary Douglas DBE, FBA (DLitt)
 Marina Warner FRSL (DLitt)
 Sir David Harrison CBE (DSc)
 Sir John Knill (DSc)
 Elizabeth J. Yerxa (DSc)

1994
 Trevor Huddleston CR (DDiv)
 Ian Mercer (LLD)
 The Lord Owen (LLD)
 Robert Pennington (LLD)
 Lieutenant General Sir Stewart Pringle (LLD)
 Sir George Christie (DLitt)
 Clive Gronow (DSc)
 Andrew Lang FRS (DSc)
 John Polkinghorne (DSc)

1993
 Robert P. Cohan CBE (DLitt)
 Michael Screech (DLitt)
 Mary Wesley (DLitt)
 Sheikh Sultan bin Muhammad Al-Qasimi (DLitt)
 Sándor Végh Hon. CBE (DMus)
 Sir John Banham (DSc)
 Sir John Cullen (DSc)
 David Rees FRS (DSc)
 Robert Wilson (DSc)

1992
 Dame Elizabeth Butler-Sloss DBE, PC (LLD)
 James Hetherington CBE (LLD)
 Christopher Pope TD, JP, DL (LLD)
 R. K. L. Hill (LLD)
 Peter Ackroyd (DLitt)
 Sir Anthony Parsons GCMG, MVO, MC (DLitt)
 Frank Harary (DSc)
 F. Gordon A. Stone CBE, FRS (DSc)

1991
 Canon John Thurmer (DDiv)
 Sir Richard Acland (LLD)
 The Lord Templeman MBE (LLD)
 Gerald Aylmer (DLitt)
 Lionel Dakers CBE (DMus)
 Michael Berry (DSc)
 Sheila Cassidy (DSc)
 Aleksandr Nikolaevich Yakovlev (DSc)

1990
 Michael Foot MP (LLD)
 Sir Brinsley Ford CBE (LLD)
 Eurfron Gwynne Jones (LLD)
 Halfdan Mahler (LLD) (DLitt)
 Jean-François Botrel (DLitt)
 David Cornwell (DLitt)
 Joaquin Rodrigo (DMus)
 Peter Bradshaw (DSc)
 Lady Anne Palmer (DSc)
 Dame Margaret Turner-Warwick DBE (DSc)

1980s
1989
 Sir Nicholas Goodison (LLD)
 Sir John Smith CBE (LLD)
 Baroness Seear (LLD)
 Sylvia Kantaris (DLitt)
 Wayne Sleep (DLitt)
 John Edgar Stevens CBE (DMus)
 Brother Adam OBE (DSc)
 Sir John Quicke, CBE (DSc)
 Sir John Harvey-Jones MBE (DSc)

1988
 Sir Antony Acland (LLD)
 W. G. Daw, OBE (LLD)
 J. L. Smeall (LLD)
 Glenda Jackson CBE (DLitt)
 Dame Elisabeth Frink (DLitt)
 F. W. Walbank CBE (DLitt)
 Daphne Jackson (DSc)
 J. E. Lovelock (DSc)
 F. J. M. Laver, CBE (DSc)

1987
 Frank Gillard CBE (LLD)
 C. D. Pike, OBE (LLD)
 Baroness Warnock OBE (DLitt)
 Richard Stanton-Jones (DSc)
 Abdus Salam (DSc)
 D. R. Barber (MSc)

1986
 Sir Robin Day OBE (LLD)
 Kenneth Rowe, MBE (LLD)
 John Mortimer CBE, QC (LLD)
 Fred L Harris, OBE (DLitt)
 Vivian Richards (DLitt)
 Ewan MacColl (DLitt)
 Jane Glover (DMus)
 Sir David Smith (DSc)

1985
 Sir Gordon Slynn (LLD)
 Sir Michael Hordern CBE (DLitt)
 Aileen, Lady Fox (DLitt)
 Sir John Gray (DSc)
 Sir Austin Pearce CBE (DSc)
 Harry Kay CBE (DSc)

1984
 Sheila Browne (LLD)
 Mr Justice Park (LLD)
 William Trevor CBE (DLitt)
 R. Aris (DSc)
 K. Ellitsgaard Rasmussen (DSc)
 Sir Alan Harris (DSc)
 Gene Kemp (MA)

1983
 Sir Jean-Pierre Warner (LLD)
 Hugh Greenwood OBE (LLD)
 John Fowles (DLitt)
 F. J. Fisher (DLitt)
 B. D. Josephson (DSc)

1982
 The Lord Young of Dartington (LLD)
 Sir Alan Dalton CBE (LLD)
 M. G. Brock CBE (DLitt)
 Patrick Heron CBE (DLitt)
 Ted Hughes OM, OBE (DLitt)
 Sir John Kendrew CBE (DSc)
 Sir David Phillips (DSc)
 L. L. Iversen (DSc)
 Jean Boxall (MA)

1981
 R. J. S. Hookway (LLD)
 Sir Kelvin Spencer CBE, MC (LLD)
 Frank Barlow CBE (DLitt)
 Jack Clemo (DLitt)
 Robert Niklaus (DLitt)
 P. G. Burke (DSc)
 W. K. Hayman (DSc)
 H. N. Rydon (DSc)
 A. G. Crouch (MSc)

1980
 The Viscount Boyd of Merton PC, CH, DL (LLD)
 Sir John Palmer (LLD)
 R. W. Turner (LLD)
 The Baroness Ryder of Warsaw CMG, OBE (LLD)
 Benjamin Luxon CBE (DMus)
 Sir Edward Abraham CBE (DSc)
 Stella M. Turk (MSc)

1970s
1979
 J. C. Alderson CBE, QPM (LLD)
 Colonel Sir John Carew Pole DSO, TD, JP (LLD)
 Christopher Hill (DLitt)
 John Richard Lill (DMus)
 G. Higman (DSc)
 Mollie Clarke OBE (MA)

1978
 Lord Mackenzie Stuart (LLD)
 Kingman Brewster (LLD)
 Alfred K. Hamilton Jenkin (DLitt)
 G. C. Ainsworth (DSc)
 R. J. Keast (MA)

1977
 General Sir John Hackett GCB, CBE, DSO, MC (LLD)
 H. B. Garland JP (DLitt)
 Charles S. Causley CBE (DLitt)
 Robert Oxton Bolt CBE (DLitt)
 Antony Hewish (DSc)
 P. D. Mitchell (DSc)

1976
 The Lord Denning (LLD)
 R. C. Tress CBE (LLD)
 Sir David Willcocks CBE, MC (DMus)
 Sir Eric Denton CBE (DSc)
 Constance R. Henson MBE (MA)

1975
 M. Robert Lecourt (LLD)
 P. J. V. D. Balsdon (DLitt)
 René Marache (DLitt)
 Michael Oakeshott (DLitt)
 Sir Kingsley Dunham (DSc)
 Sir Rex Richards (DSc)

1974
 Colonel J. E. Palmer CBE, TD, DL (LLD)
 Jeremy Thorpe (LLD)
 David Douglas (DLitt)
 W. G. Hoskins CBE (DLitt)
 Dame L. H. N. Cooper DBE (DSc)
 H. M. Stanley (DSc)
 Sir Rodney Smith (DSc)
 Vera Lloyd (MA)

1973
 Canon G. R. Dunstan CBE (DDiv)
 Marcus Knight (LLD)
 Sir John Llewellyn KCMG (LLD)
 C. A. Ralegh Radford (DLitt)
 Air Commodore Sir Frank Whittle KBE, OM, CB (DSc)
 Norman Lyne (MA)

1972
 Dr Margaret Jackson JP (LLD)
 Judge Pratt (LLD)
 L. K. Elmhirst (DLitt)
 Sir Raymond Firth (DLitt)
 C. T. Ingold CMG (DSc)
 Andrew Stratton (DSc)

1971
 W. A. E. Westall (DDiv)
 Sir Jack Hayward (LLD)
 The Lord Widgery PC, OBE, TD (LLD)
 Sir John Betjeman CBE (DLitt)
 Dame Frances Yates DBE (DLitt)
 Sir Frederick Dainton (DSc)
 J. A. Church (MA)

1970
 Sir Kenneth Wheare CMG (LLD)
 G. E. Fussell (DLitt)
 Canon J. B. Phillips (DLitt)
 Malcolm Arnold CBE (DMus)
 P. H. Kuenen (DSc)
 Sir Hugh Tett (DSc)

1960s
1969
 H. Freville (LLD)
 The Lord Roborough JP (LLD)
 J. Whiteside, OBE (LLD)
 Sir Alexander Cairncross KCMG (LLD)
 Imogen Holst CBE (DLitt)
 H. L. Beales (DLitt)
 Dame Kathleen Kenyon DBE (DLitt)
 B. F. Skinner (DSc)
 Sir Eric Eastwood CBE (DSc)
 Sir Peter Medawar CH, KBE (DSc)

1968
 The Lord Caradon PC, GCMG, KCVO, OBE (LLD)
 A. S. Neill (LLD)
 Sir Martin Davies CBE (DLitt)
 V. H. Galbraith (DLitt)
 The Lord Holford (DLitt)
 G. Wilson Knight CBE (DLitt)
 D. C. Hodgkin OM (DSc)
 Sir Eric Smith CBE (DSc)
 E. A. Paddon (MA)
 L. M. Tate OBE (MSc)

1967
 Sir James Cook (LLD)

1966
 Henri Le Moal (LLD)
 Sir Leslie Scarman OBE (LLD)
 Cleanth Brooks (DLitt)
 Sir Frank Francis KCB (DLitt)
 Dame Barbara Hepworth DBE (DLitt)
 The Lord Blackett CH (DSc)
 William Keble Martin (DSc)
 Margaret Digby OBE (MA)

1965
 Sir George Hayter-Hames CBE, JP (LLD)
 Field Marshal Sir Richard Hull GCB, DSO (LLD)
 Marcel Bataillon (DLitt)
 Herbert Dieckmann (DLitt)
 Cecil Day Lewis CBE (DLitt)
 Sir Dudley Stamp CBE (DSc)
 Sir Patrick Linstead CBE (DSc)
 Gerald Whitmarsh CBE (MA)

1964

None

1963
 Dorothy Whitney Elmhirst (LLD)
 The Lord Helsby GCB, KBE (LLD)
 Sir Peter Scott CH, CBE, DSC (LLD)
 Sir Henry Slesser PC, JP (LLD)
 Sydney Chapman (DSc)
 Professor A. V. Hill CH, OBE (DSc)

1962
 A. P. Steele-Perkins MC (LLD)

1961
 Theodor Heuss (LLD)
 Sir Paul Sinker KCMG, CB (LLD)
 Bernard Leach CBE (DLitt)
 Agatha Christie DBE (DLitt)
 Sir William Hodge (DSc)

1960
 C. J. Fuller (LLD)
 B. G. Lampard-Vachell CBE, JP (LLD)
 Sir David Hughes Parry QC (LLD)
 Carl Dolmetsch CBE (DLitt)
 The Lord Robbins CH, CB (DLitt)
 A. L. Rowse (DLitt)
 Enid Starkie CBE (DLitt)
 Sir Frederick Russell CBE (DSc)
 The Lord Todd (DSc)

1950s
1959
 Sayed Mekki Abbas (LLD)
 The Viscount Amery KG, PC, GCMG, TD, DL (LLD)
 Sir Arthur Reed JP (LLD)
 John Hay Whitney CBE (LLD)
 Colonel Sidney John Worsley DSO, MC, TD (LLD)
 The Dowager Viscountess Astor CH (LLD)
 Isaac Foot JP (DLitt)
 Paul Henry (DLitt)
 Ernest Newman (DLitt)
 Sir Harry Melville KCB (DSc)

1958

None

1957
 Sir John Daw JP (LLD)
 E. Vincent Harris OBE (LLD)
 W. H. Lewis (LLD)
 A. K. Woodbridge (MA)

1956
 The Dowager Duchess of Devonshire GCVO, CBE (LLD)
 Colonel The Earl Fortescue KG, MC (LLD)
 Sir Hector Hetherington GBE, DL (LLD)
 J. L. Morill (LLD)
 The Earl of Crawford and Balcarres KT, GBE (DLitt)
 John Murray (DLitt)
 The Marquess of Salisbury KG (DLitt)
 Sir James Chadwick (DSc)

References

England education-related lists
Lists of honorary degree recipients
 Honorary
Exeter